Charles Sirato (26 January 1905, in Újvidék – 1 January 1980, in Budapest) was a Hungarian poet, art theorist, and translator. He most famously authored the Dimensionist manifesto.

Life

Pre-1930

Dimensionist manifesto
In 1936 in Paris, Charles Tamkó Sirató published his Manifeste Dimensioniste, which described how 

The manifesto was signed by many prominent modern artists worldwide. Yervand Kochar, Hans Arp, Francis Picabia, Kandinsky, Robert Delaunay and Marcel Duchamp amongst others added their names in Paris, then a short while later it was endorsed by artists abroad including László Moholy-Nagy, Joan Miró, David Kakabadze, Alexander Calder, and Ben Nicholson.

List of works

Literature
Manifeste Dimensioniste, 1936
Az Élet tavaszán, 1921
Le Planisme, 1936
Kiáltás, 1942
A három űrsziget, 1969
A Vízöntő-kor hajnalán, 1969
Tengereczki Pál, 1970
A hegedű vőlegénye, 1971
Pinty és Ponty, 1972
Kozmogrammok, 1975
Tengereczki hazaszáll, 1975
Szélkiáltó, 1977
Jövőbúvárok, 1980
Összegyűjtött versei I., 1993

References

Hungarian artists
Hungarian male poets
1905 births
1980 deaths
20th-century Hungarian poets
20th-century Hungarian male writers